Andrzej Leszczyński may refer to:

 Andrzej Leszczyński (1553–1606), starost of Nakło, voivode of Brześć Kujawski
 Andrzej Leszczyński (1606–1651), Voivode of Dorpat Voivodship
 Andrzej Leszczyński (1608–1658), chancellor and primate